() is the study of poetic meters, which identifies the meter of a poem and determines whether the meter is sound or broken in lines of the poem. It is often called the Science of Poetry. Its laws were laid down by Al-Khalīl ibn Aḥmad al-Farāhīdī (d. 786), an early Arab lexicographer and philologist. In his book , which is no longer extant, he described 15 types of meter.

These larger units make up feet (pl. ).

Western prosodists, on the other hand, usually analyse the meters in terms of syllables, which can be long (–), short (u) and anceps (x), that is, a syllable which can be optionally long or short. Certain meters also have biceps positions where a pair of short syllables can optionally be replaced by a long one.

Rhyme is an important part of classical Arabic poetry. Almost all Arabic poetry is composed in couplets and the same rhyme is used in the second half of each couplet throughout the poem.

Meters 
The feet of an Arabic poem are traditionally represented by mnemonic words called . In most poems there are eight of these: four in the first half of the verse and four in the second; in other cases, there will be six of them, meaning three in the first half of the verse and three in the second.

The  (meters) (sg. baḥr ), identified according to the traditional method, are the following. Underneath each meter is its scansion by the European method (read from left to right), where – = a long syllable, u = a short syllable, x = either long or short, uu = 1 long or two shorts.

Those meters marked with an asterisk (*) are mainly theoretical, and in practice rarely used by poets.

Circle 1
 Ṭawīl "long": 
| u – x | u – – – | u – x | u – u – |

 Madīd "protracted": 
| x u – – | x u – | x u – – |

 Basīṭ "spread out": 
| x – u – | x u – | – – u – | uu – |

Circle 2
 Kāmil "complete": 
| uu – u – | uu – u – | uu – u – |

 Wāfir "abundant": 
| u – uu – | u – uu – | u – – |

Circle 3
 Hazaj "trilling": 
| u – – x | u – – x |

 Rajaz "trembling": 
| x – u – | x – u – | x – u – |

 Ramal "trotting": 
| x u – – | x u – – | x u – |

Circle 4
 Sarīʿ "swift": 
| x x u – | x x u – | – u – |

 Munsariħ "quick-paced": 
| x – u – | – x – u | – u u – |

 Khafīf "light": 
| x u – x | – – u – | x u – x |

 *Muḍāriʿ "similar": 
| u – x x | – u – – |

 *Muqtaḍab "untrained": 
| x u – u | – u u – |

 Mujtathth "cut-off": 
| x – u – | x u – – |

Circle 5
 Mutaqārib "nearing": 
| u – x | u – x | u – x | u – |

 *Mutadārik "overtaking": 
| x u – | x u – | x u – | (x u –) | ( – can be substituted for u u)

Sequences of three short syllables are not found in any Arabic meter, except occasionally in a variation of the rajaz meter, in which | x – u – | may sometimes be replaced by | x u u – |.

Frequency of the meters
Analysis of anthologies of classical Arabic poetry shows that some of these meters are much more common than others.

The  make 3%,  2.4%, and all the rest together about 2%.

In Stoetzer's (1986) corpus of 130 poems of the 8th century, the  accounts for 35% of the poems,  20%,  14%,  13%,  3%,  7%, and the rest about 6%.

Among the 1385 short poems included in the Arabian Nights,  is used in 24%,  24%,  23%,  10%,  2%,  2%,  5%,  4%,  1%,  1%, and  3%. These last three were usually regarded as artificial meters. The  breaks almost all regular rules of meter, however it was highly regarded by Arabic Grammarians in the 10th century CE, and was noted for its eloquence. Its earliest attestation is in the 7th century CE by Amr Bin Jabir Al Jani in a poem for praise of the prophet: 

The collated figures can be expressed in a table as follows:

Al-Khalil's terminology 
In European descriptions, these are conventionally abbreviated "P" and "K" respectively. A "peg" is a sequence of two syllables, usually short + long (u –) (a  ); but occasionally in the rarely used metres of circle 4, long + short (– u) (a ). A "cord" is a short syllable (u), long syllable (–), or two shorts (u u). Surprisingly, al-Khalil's system makes no use of the concept of the syllable as such.

Thus a half-line of the  metre (| u – x | u – x – | u – x | u – u – |) is analysed as PK PKK PK PKK. A complete line of poetry usually consists of either six or eight feet, but sometimes shorter lines are found.

When analysing a verse, an Arab prosodist begins by rewriting the line phonetically, that is, as it is actually pronounced. Thus the word ,  in  writing is written phonetically as "". In a word like  (pronounced , meaning "the sun"), where the "l" of the article is assimilated to the first consonant of the noun, the actual sound is written instead; so in  writing, this is written  (ššms). Thus a  will be represented in the scansion by two  symbols and one .

The  and the  have two parts each:

 Al-Khalil's circles 
Khalil noticed that the metres can be divided into different groups. If a meter is written out in a circle, then by starting in different places on the circle it is possible to derive the other meters of the same group. Expressed in terms of syllables rather than Khalil's silent and moving letters, the different circles can be tabulated as follows. The columns marked P are the "pegs" (awtād), while between each peg and the next are either one or two "cords" (asbāb). The order of metres is the one traditionally used by poets such as Al-Maʿarri, who arranged his poems not only by rhyme by also metrically.

Meters in the same circle have similar features. For example, the meters in circle 1 all make use of feet of 3 syllables alternating with feet of 4 syllables. Both meters in circle 2 make use of biceps elements, in which a pair of short syllables can be replaced by a long one (uu); meters of circle 4 all have one place in the hemistich (half-line) where the watid is a trochee (– u) instead of an iamb (u –); the meters of circle 5 have short feet of PK PK or KP KP.

The above meters are given in their tetrameter form, but some (such as the madīd) are generally found with only three feet per hemistich.

As Stoetzer (1982) points out, the anceps syllables (x) in tables such as the above are in many cases not really anceps, but merely an abstraction to make it seem that two different meters belong to the same circle. For example, the penultimate syllable of the Ṭawīl (the 13th) in practice is always short, while the corresponding syllable in Basīṭ (the 8th) is always long.

Variations
Variations of these meters can be found. Some exist in shorter or longer forms, for example with either three or four feet in each half-line (known as trimeter and tetrameter respectively). Some meters have a catalectic variation, in which the end of the line is shortened by one syllable.

A whole series of Arabic technical terms exists to describe these variations. There are 14 possible  and 34 possible .

 Minor rules of prosody 
There are a number of prosodic conventions which are observed in writing and scanning Arabic poetry, of which the following are the most important:
The case endings -u (Nominative), -a (Accusative), -i (Genitive), known as ʾiʿrāb, which in prose are always omitted in pronunciation at the end of a clause or sentence, are usually pronounced in poetry, even at the end of a sentence.
At the end of a line (and sometimes at the end of the first hemistich), any vowel is considered long. in this position a short -i can rhyme with a long one. The vowel fatḥa (a) at the end of a line is written with an alif, as if it were a long vowel.
The -n on the indefinite case endings -un, -an, -in is dropped at the end of a line, making -ū, -ā, -ī. (This does not apply at the end of the first half-line, however.)
The ending -hu "his" is frequently pronounced with a long vowel: -hū. The pronoun anā "I" can also be scanned as ana.
A long ī can occasionally rhyme with a long ū; for example,  "the Nile" can rhyme with  "acceptable".
Although the two halves of a bayt are usually separate, it is not uncommon to find lines where there is no break between them, and a word continues across the division in the middle of the line.

 See also 
 Arabic phonology
 Arabic grammar
 

 References 

 Bibliography 
Abdel-Malek, Zaki N. (2019)Towards a New Theory of Arabic Prosody (5th edition).
Alnagdawi, M., et al. (2013). "Finding Arabic Poem Meter using Context Free Grammar". J. of Commun. and Comput. Eng. 3.1.52-59
Elwell-Sutton, L.P. (1976).The Persian Metres. Cambridge University Press.
Frolov, Dmitry (1996). "The Circles of al-Khalil and the structure of Luzumiyyat of Abu 'l-'Ala' al-Ma'arri". Studies in Near Eastern Languages and Literatures. Memorial Volume of Karel Petraček, Praha, 1996, 223-236.
Golston, Chris & Riad, Tomas (1997). "The Phonology of classical Arabic meter". Linguistics 35 (1997), 111-132.
Maling, J.M. (1973). The Theory of Classical Arabic Metrics. Massachusetts Institute of Technology. PhD Thesis.
McCarus, Ernest N. (1983). "Identifying the Meters of Arabic Poetry", Al-'Arabiyya vol 16. no. 1/2, pp. 57–83. (Georgetown University Press).
Scott, Hazel (2009). "Pegs, Cords, and Ghuls: Meter of Classical Arabic Poetry". Swarthmore College.
Stoetzer, Willem (1982). "Some Observations on Quantity in Arabic Metrics". Journal of Arabic Literature, Vol. 13 (1982), pp. 66–75. (JSTOR)
Stoetzer, W.F.G.J. (1989), Theory and Practice in Arabic Metrics, Het Oosters Instituut, Leiden.
Weil, Gotthold (1958), Grundriss und System der altarabischen Metren (Wiesbaden).
Wright, W. (1951). A Grammar of the Arabic Language'', vol. II, Cambridge University Press, pp. 350–390.

Arabic grammar
Prosody (linguistics)
Arabic poetry
Arabic and Central Asian poetics
Prosodies by language